Nefertem (possibly "beautiful one who closes" or "one who does not close"; also spelled Nefertum or Nefer-temu) was, in Egyptian mythology, originally a lotus flower at the creation of the world, who had arisen from the primal waters. 
Nefertem represented both the first sunlight and the delightful smell of the Egyptian blue lotus flower, having arisen from the primal waters within an Egyptian blue water-lily, Nymphaea caerulea. Some of the titles of Nefertem were "He Who is Beautiful" and "Water-Lily of the Sun", and a version of the Book of the Dead says:

Nefertem was eventually seen as the son of the creator god Ptah, and the goddesses Sekhmet and Bast were sometimes called his mother. In art, Nefertem is usually depicted as a beautiful young man having blue water-lily flowers around his head. As the son of Bastet, he also sometimes has the head of a lion or is a lion or cat reclining. The ancient Egyptians  often carried small statuettes of him as good-luck charms.

One of the most notable depictions of Nefertem is the Head of Nefertem, a wooden bust depicting a young king Tutankhamun as Nefertem with his head emerging from a lotus flower.

Gallery

References

Further reading
 

Solar gods
Egyptian gods
Beauty gods
Mythological plants
Sekhmet
Lion deities
Flowers in religion
Cat deities
Bastet

ca:Llista de personatges de la mitologia egípcia#N